Habenaria floribunda is a species of orchid which is widespread across much of Latin America, the West Indies and Florida.

References

External links
 
 
 Atlas of Florida Vascular Plants,  Habenaria floribunda
 IOSPE orchid photos, Habenaria floribunda , Photos By ©Prem Subrahmanyam 

floribunda
Orchids of North America
Orchids of South America
Orchids of Central America
Orchids of Belize
Orchids of Mexico
Flora of Florida
Flora of the Caribbean
Plants described in 1835
Flora of Peru
Terrestrial orchids
Flora without expected TNC conservation status